The Balboa 24 is an American trailerable sailboat that was designed by W. Shad Turner and William Downing as a racer-cruiser and first built in 1981.

The Balboa 24 is a development of the similar 1980 Laguna 24S.

Production
The design was built in the United States by Coastal Recreation, Inc in Costa Mesa, California and Laguna Yachts of Stanton, California, which bought out Coastal Recreation. The boat is now out of production.

Design
The Balboa 24 is a recreational keelboat, built predominantly of fiberglass, with wood trim. It has a 7/8 fractional sloop rig with anodized aluminum spars. A masthead rig was optional. The hull has a raked stem, a plumb transom, a transom-hung rudder controlled by a tiller and a fixed fin shoal draft keel. The cabin is equipped with a "pop-top". It has a  mast, displaces  and carries  of ballast. An optional tall rig version with a  mast and a masthead rig displaces  and carries  of ballast.

It is normally fitted with a small outboard motor for docking and maneuvering.

The design has sleeping accommodation for five people, with a double "V"-berth in the bow cabin, a straight settee in the main cabin and an aft berth on the port side. The galley is located on the starboard side just forward of the companionway ladder. The galley is "L"-shaped and is equipped with a two-burner, alcohol-fired stove, an ice box and a sink. The head is located just aft of the bow cabin on the starboard side. The interior is trimmed with teak.

Ventilation is provided by a plexiglass hatch on the foredeck and a cabin pop-top that also provides  of headroom when in the open position.

The design has a Portsmouth Yardstick DP-N racing average handicap of 99.0, a PHRF of 186 and is raced with a crew of two sailors.

Operational history
In a 1994 review Richard Sherwood wrote, "Two rigs are available for this sloop. The first has a 26 1/2-foot mast; the taller rig has a 28-foot mast and 200 additional pounds of ballast. The latter is the better rig for racing."

In a 2010 review Steve Henkel noted that the boat has only  of cabin headroom and a short keel that may reduce upwind performance.

See also
List of sailing boat types

Related development
Balboa 16
Balboa 20
Balboa 21
Balboa 22
Balboa 23

Similar sailboats
Achilles 24
Atlantic City catboat
C&C 24
Challenger 24
Columbia 24
Islander 24
Islander 24 Bahama
MacGregor 24
Mirage 24
Nutmeg 24
San Juan 24
Seidelmann 245
Tonic 23

References

Keelboats
1980s sailboat type designs
Sailing yachts
Two-person sailboats
Sailboat type designs by W. Shad Turner
Sailboat types built by Coastal Recreation, Inc
Sailboat types built by Laguna Yachts